There are four groups in the Europe/Africa Zone of the Davis Cup. The four winners of Group I advance to the World Group play-offs while the last placed teams will be relegated to Group II the following year. The winners of Group II gets promoted to Group I next year, the four last placed teams get relegated to Group III. The top two teams of the Europe Group III gets promoted to Group II. The top two teams of the Africa Group III gets promoted to Group II.

Group I

Draw

Group II

Draw

Group III Europe

 
 
 
 
 
 
 

 
  – promoted to 2012 Davis Cup Europe/Africa Zone Group II
 
 
 
  – promoted to 2012 Davis Cup Europe/Africa Zone Group II

Group III Africa

 
 
 
 
 
  – promoted to 2012 Davis Cup Europe/Africa Zone Group II
 

 
 
  – promoted to 2012 Davis Cup Europe/Africa Zone Group II

References

External links
Official Site

 
Europe Africa Zone
Davis Cup Europe/Africa Zone